Jason Kao Hwang (born 1957) is a Chinese American violinist and composer. He is known for his unconventional and improvisational jazz violin technique as well as his chamber opera The Floating Box: A Story in Chinatown which premiered in 2001 and was released in 2005 on New World Records.

Life and career
Hwang's parents had emigrated to the United States from Hunan after World War II. He was born in Lake Forest, Illinois and grew up in Waukegan. He studied classical violin before attending New York University where he received a degree in film and television. During his time at NYU, he became interested in jazz, and soon devoted himself to a career as a musician. He was active in New York City's free jazz scene in the late 1970s and early 1980s, but over the next decade he increasingly focused on Asian American jazz. His later work, including his opera The Floating Box and his extended composition Burning Bridge for a mixed ensemble of jazz, classical and Chinese instruments, has explored his own identity as an Asian American.

Discography

With Jason Kao Hwang and the Spontaneous River Orchestra
Symphony of Souls (Mulatta Records), 2013
With Anthony Braxton
Sextet (Istanbul) 1996 (Braxton House, 1995 [1996])
Octet (New York) 1995 (Braxton House, 1995 [1997])
With Jerome Cooper
Outer and Interactions (About Time, 1988)
With Dominic Duval
Cries and Whispers (Cadence Jazz, 1999 [2001])
With William Parker
Through Acceptance of the Mystery Peace (Centering, 1980)
Sunrise in the Tone World (AUM Fidelity, 1995 [1997])
With Henry Threadgill
Too Much Sugar for a Dime (Axiom, 1993)
Carry the Day (Columbia, 1995)
With Reggie Workman
Altered Spaces (Leo, 1993)

See also
Asian American jazz

References

External links

American jazz violinists
American male violinists
American jazz composers
American musicians of Chinese descent
Musicians from Chicago
1957 births
Living people
CIMP artists
Jazz musicians from Illinois
21st-century American violinists
American male jazz composers
21st-century American male musicians